MTV2 Album Covers: Guster/Violent Femmes is an EP by Guster that includes covers of songs by Violent Femmes.   The 2004 release is part of MTV2's album cover series.

Track listing
 "Careful" – 3:42
 "Blister in the Sun" – 2:43
 "Kiss Off" – 2:59
 "Gone Daddy Gone" (Acoustic, WBR Sessions) – 3:06
 "Add It Up" (Acoustic, WBR Sessions) – 4:50

2004 EPs
Live EPs
Covers EPs
2004 live albums
Guster albums